Richelieu–Drouot is a station of the Paris Métro on Line 8 and Line 9. It was opened on 30 June 1928 with the extension of line 8 from Opéra and line 9 from Chaussée d'Antin.

History
The station was opened on 30 June 1928 with the simultaneous commissioning of extensions of line 8 from Opéra and line 9 from Chaussée d'Antin - La Fayette. It then constituted the western terminus of these two lines (respectively from Porte d'Auteuil and Porte de Saint-Cloud) until 5 May 1931 when line 8 was extended to Porte de Charenton1 and until 10 December 1933 for line 9 which is then extended to Porte de Montreuil.

The line 8 station is the first in the network to have been built with platforms 105 meters long, which would subsequently be extended to all the stopping points on the section up to Maisons- Alfort - Les Juilliotes and that of Balard at La Motte-Picquet - Grenelle, as well as at the new stations of lines 1, 3, 7 and 9. These dimensions were planned to accommodate trains of seven cars, a project which did not materialise, except temporarily on line 8 during the Paris Colonial Exposition of 1931 which was held in the Bois de Vincennes.

It is named after the Boulevard de Richelieu and Rue Drouot. Richelieu (1585–1642) was Secretary of State to Louis XIII. Antoine Drouot (1774–1847) was Aide-de-camp to Napoleon I in 1813 and accompanied him to Elba and during his brief comeback known as the Hundred Days.

In addition, it was in this station that a young Frenchman Jacques Fesch was disarmed and arrested on 25 February 1954, after fleeing following the robbery of a Bureau de change, followed by the murder of a police officer, crimes that led to his execution on 1 October 1957.

Like a third of the stations on the network, between 1974 and 1984 the stopping points on both lines were modernized by adopting the Andreu-Motte decorative style, blue for line 8 and orange on line 9, with preservation of the original earthenware in both cases.

As part of the RATP's Un métro + beau modernisation programme, all the station's corridors were renovated by 25 April 2015.

According to RATP estimates, the station saw 5,014,491 passengers enter in 2019, which places it in 81st position among metro stations for its attendance. In 2020, with the Covid-19 crisis, its annual traffic fell to 2,313,492 passengers, relegating it to 99th place, before gradually rising in 2021 with 2,994,510 entries recorded, which demoted it to 108th position of stations in the network.

Passenger services

Access
The station has eight entrances, six of which are adorned with Dervaux candelabras:
 Entrance 1 - Boulevard Haussmann, consisting of a fixed staircase, on Place Daniel-Iffla-Osiris at the corner of Boulevard Haussmann and Boulevard des Italiens;
 Entrance 2 - Rue de Richelieu, consisting of a fixed staircase, located to the right of no. 3 on the Boulevard des Italiens;
 Entrance 3 - Boulevard Montmartre, consisting of a fixed staircase, located opposite no. 2 Boulevard Haussmann;
 Entrance 4 - Rue Chauchat, consisting of a fixed staircase, leading to the right of no. 6 Boulevard Haussmann;
 Entrance 5 - Rue Laffitte, consisting of a fixed staircase allowing exit only, located on Boulevard Haussmann behind the BNP Paribas headquarters;
 Entrance 6 - Rue Taitbout, consisting of a fixed staircase, located opposite the head office of BNP Paribas at no. 6 Boulevard des Italiens;
 Entrance 7 - Rue de Marivaux - Opéra-Comique, consisting of a fixed staircase, leading to the right of no. 11 Boulevard des Italiens;
 Entrance 8 - Boulevard des Italiens, consisting of an ascending escalator allowing only an exit, located opposite no. 2 of this boulevard.

 Between the two access corridors to line 9, opposite the sales area, is the war memorial of the Compagnie du Chemin de Fer Métropolitain de Paris (CMP). Inaugurated in 1931, it was sculpted Carlo Sarrabezolles.

This black marble monument is dedicated to the memory of the employees of the Metro who died for France. The central sculpture is decorated with a caryatid, that supports with its raised arms the twist of stone which surrounds it. It separates the semi-circle into two parts, inside which are inscribed the names of the Metro officials who disappeared during the First World War. The base of the monument bears the names of the battlefields of the Great War. The word Liberation was added at the bottom right after the Second World War, to mark the participation of network agents in the French Resistance.

Station layout

Platforms
The platforms of the two lines are of a standard configuration. Two in number per stop, they are separated by the metro tracks located in the centre and the vault is elliptical. Their decoration is in the Andreu-Motte style. Those of line 8 have a blue lighting canopy, benches, corridor outlets and the tunnel exit on the Pointe du Lac side is in flat blue tiles as well as blue Motte seats. Those of line 9 have an orange lighting canopy, bench seats and exits in flat orange tiles and orange Motte seats. For both lines, these arrangements are combined with bevelled white ceramic tiles covering the side walls, the vault, and the rest of the tunnel exits, as well as advertising frames in honey-coloured earthenware with plant motifs and the name of the station is also in earthenware, in the interwar style of the original CMP.

These platforms are among the few to still present the Andreu-Motte style in its entirety, if we exclude the tunnel exits (whose treatment with flat coloured tiles was not systematic).

Bus connections
The station is served by lines 20, 32, 39, 45, 74 and 85 of the RATP Bus Network.

Nearby
 Town Hall 9th arrondissement
 Hôtel Drouot
 Opéra-Comique
 Passage des Princes
 Headquarters of Le Figaro newspaper
 Golf-Drouot (defunct)
 Cafe d'Angleterre (defunct)

Gallery

References

Roland, Gérard (2003). Stations de métro. D’Abbesses à Wagram. Éditions Bonneton.

Paris Métro stations in the 2nd arrondissement of Paris
Paris Métro stations in the 9th arrondissement of Paris
Railway stations in France opened in 1928
Articles containing video clips